Howard Carston Catcheside OBE (18 August 1899 – 10 May 1987) was an English rugby union player. He was nicknamed 'Catchy'. He won eight caps for England and in his later life became a rugby administrator.

Personal history
Catheside was born in Sunderland, England in 1899. He was educated at Oundle School in Northampton. With the outbreak of First World War, Catcheside served in the British Army where posted to the Royal Field Artillery, reaching the rank of second-lieutenant. He served his country again in the Second World War, once more in the Royal Field Artillery, where he was lieutenant-colonel. He received the OBE for military duties in 1945.

Rugby career
Catcheside came to prominence as a rugby player while playing at wing for Percy Park, the team he would represent throughout his entire international career. He was also selected at county level and represented Northumberland.

He made his England debut on 19 January 1924 against Wales. That year he became the first player to score a try in each round of the then Five nations championship with two tries coming against Wales. This feat was not equalled by another Englishman until 2002 by Will Greenwood. His final game for England came against Scotland on 10 March 1927.

Between 1932 and 1940 he was honorary treasurer of the Northumberland Rugby Union and from 1936 until 1962 he was a selector for the Rugby Football Union (RFU). In 1951 he was made chairman of the RFU, a post he held until 1962.

Notes

1899 births
1987 deaths
British Army personnel of World War I
British Army personnel of World War II
England international rugby union players
English rugby union players
Officers of the Order of the British Empire
People educated at Oundle School
Royal Field Artillery officers
Rugby union officials
Rugby union players from Sunderland
Rugby union wings